Richard Eybner (March 3, 1896 – June 20, 1986) was an Austrian actor at the theatre and in films.

Selected filmography
 Spring Parade (1934)
 Peter (1934)
 Little Mother (1935)
 Dance Music (1935)
 The Postman from Longjumeau (1936)
 Hannerl and Her Lovers (1936)
 Fräulein Lilli (1936)
 Premiere (1937)
 I Am Sebastian Ott (1939)
 Beloved Augustin (1940)
 Whom the Gods Love (1942)
 Two Happy People (1943)
 The White Dream (1943)
 Kiss Me Casanova (1949)
 Vienna Waltzes (1951)
 Season in Salzburg (1952)
 Franz Schubert (1953)
 Wilhelm Tell (1956)
Der schönste Tag meines Lebens (1957)
 Sissi: The Young Empress (1956)
 Eva (1958)
 Big Request Concert (1960)
 Gustav Adolf's Page (1960)
 The Spendthrift (1964)
 When the Grapevines Bloom on the Danube (1965)

References

External links

 

1896 births
1986 deaths
Austrian male film actors
People from Sankt Pölten
20th-century Austrian male actors
Burials at Döbling Cemetery